Ten Years Of Toys is a compilation album by English punk-rock group, Toy Dolls, released in 1989. The cover image was designed and photographed by Tony Gray (Neat Records).

Track listing 
All songs written by Michael "Olga" Algar, except where noted.

 "Florence Is Deaf (But There's No Need To Shout)" - 3:35
 "Glenda & The Test Tube Baby' - 3:16
 "Idle Gossip" - 2:31
 "Carol Dodds Is Pregnant" - 3:26
 "Tommy Kowey's Car" - 2:39
 "Peter Practice's Practice Place" - 3:07
 "Deidre's A Slag" - 3:19
 "Blue Suede Shoes" (Carl Perkins) - 2:10
 "Dig That Groove Baby" - 2:51
 "Lambrusco Kid" - 3:09
 "Dougy Giro" - 3:14
 "Bless You My Son" - 2:53
 "My Girlfriend's Dad's A Vicar" - 1:12
 "She Goes To Finos" - 3:07
 "Harry Cross (A Tribute To Edna)" - 3:34
 "Fiery Jack" - 2:54
 "I've Got Asthma" (Bonus Track) - 2:27

Personnel 
 Michael "Olga" Algar - vocals, guitar
 Dean "Dean James" Robson - bass, vocals
 Martin "Marty" Yule - drums, vocals

The album also used a drum machine.

References

External links 

 Full album lyrics
 Wakey Wakey page on The Toy Dolls website

1989 compilation albums
Toy Dolls albums